Lapandav is a 1993 Indian Marathi-language romantic comedy film directed by Shravani Deodhar and produced by Sachin Parekar and Sanjay Parekar. It stars an ensemble cast of Ashok Saraf, Vandana Gupte, Vikram Gokhale, Savita Prabhune, Sunil Barve, Varsha Usgaonkar, Ajinkya Deo and Pallavi Ranade.

Plot 
Abhijeet Samarth (Ashok Saraf) and Anant Mahashabde (Vikram Gokhale) are close friends in their mid-40s who get along each Saturday for a drink and enjoy some poetry. Abhijeet is the lazy owner of a gymnasium and lives a wealthy lifestyle with his wife Asavari (Vandana Gupte), collegiate daughter Rasika (Varsha Usgaonkar) and elderly father (Bal Karve). On the other hand, Anant is a hardworking lawyer and lives a middle-class lifestyle with his wife Ulka (Savita Prabhune), collegiate son Aseem (Sunil Barve), school-going daughter Chinu (Sai Deodhar) and elderly mother. 

Aseem and Rasika are friends in college along with Aseem's middle-class closest friend Mugdha (Pallavi Ranade) and Rasika's wealthy boyfriend Vicky Malgude (Ajinkya Deo). Mugdha is secretly in love with Aseem, who has a crush on Rasika despite the fact that she is going good with Vicky. While hesitating to express her feelings before Aseem, Mugdha writes an anonymous love letter to him and draws three crosses and three hearts in conclusion, slipping the letter in Aseem's bag. At college, Aseem and his friends find the letter in his bag and wonder who can the girl be. 

At last, Aseem makes a guess that the letter was written to him by Rasika due to his feelings for her. Upon learning this, a saddened Mugdha advises him to write her an anonymous letter, the same way he was written the letter by "Rasika". Agreeing to her advice, Aseem writes an anonymous love letter for Rasika 
and asks Mugdha to deliver it to her. However, Mugdha secretly switches the letter with another one that is more sensible with the three crosses and three hearts in conclusion. Rasika receives the letter from Mugdha and is instantly impressed with the romanticism of the sender. 

In the meantime, Ulka ends up discovering Mugdha's love letter for Aseem but mistakes it to be addressed to Anant. She is heartbroken to believe that Anant is having an extramarital affair and hides the letter in his law book. At the court, Anant finds the letter in his law book and is amused to believe that it is from Asavari. Thus, Anant tries to get closer to Asavari and transforms himself into a "youth" by undergoing a complete makeover and wearing modern clothes. Elsewhere, Abhijeet comes across Aseem's love letter for Rasika and he too mistakes it to be addressed to Asavari. 

This causes Abhijeet to suspect that Asavari is also having an extramarital affair with Anant due to their daily meetings as marriage counsellers. Abhijeet and Ulka share their conceptions with each other and deduce that they have been betrayed by their respective spouses. Meanwhile, Rasika learns that the letter was written to her by Aseem and dumps Vicky, getting into a relationship with him. However, she is confused between his real nature and the nature of Aseem in the letter. Will all the misunderstandings get cleared and all the couples eventually reunite with each other?

Cast 
 Ashok Saraf as Abhijeet Samarth
 Vandana Gupte as Advocate Asavari Samarth
 Vikram Gokhale as Advocate Anant Mahashabde
 Savita Prabhune as Ulka Mahashabde
 Sunil Barve as Aseem Mahashabde
 Varsha Usgaonkar as Rasika Samarth
 Ajinkya Deo as Vicky Malgude
 Pallavi Ranade as Mugdha
 Bal Karve as Mr. Samarth (Abhijeet's father) 
 Sai Deodhar as Chinu Mahashabde (Aseem's younger sister) 
 Shriram Pendse as Mugdha's father
 Kishore Nandlaskar as Advocate Harkar (Anant's colleague) 
 Anand Ingle as Rangya (Aseem and Vicky's college friend)
 Paresh Mokashi as Aseem and Vicky's college friend

Guest Appearances  
 Asavari Ghotikar as Harkar's client
 Sushma Deshpande as Asavari's client
 Haider Ali as Pawandutt (Abhijeet's friend)

Soundtrack
The music has been directed by Anand Modak, while the lyrics have been provided by Mangesh Kulkarni.

Track listing

Recognition
 1993, Shrabani Deodhar won National Film Award's Silver Lotus for 'Best Marathi Feature Film' for Lapandav.
 1993, Pallavi Ranade won Best Actress at the 31st Maharashtra State Awards for playing the character of Mugdha.

References

External links 
  Article - gomolo.com
  Article - gomolo.com
 

1993 films
1990s Marathi-language films
Best Marathi Feature Film National Film Award winners
Films directed by Shrabani Deodhar
Films scored by Anand Modak